Paulo Fernando Estalagem Poejo (born 30 September 1973), known as Poejo, is a Portuguese football coach and a former player.

He played 8 seasons and 159 games in the Primeira Liga for Campomaiorense, União de Leiria, Estrela da Amadora, Alverca and Sporting.

Club career
He made his Primeira Liga debut for Sporting on 30 December 1993 in a game against Marítimo.

References

External links
 
 

1973 births
Footballers from Lisbon
Living people
Portuguese footballers
Portugal youth international footballers
Portugal under-21 international footballers
Sporting CP footballers
Primeira Liga players
U.D. Leiria players
C.F. Estrela da Amadora players
C.D. Aves players
Liga Portugal 2 players
S.C. Campomaiorense players
F.C. Alverca players
C.D. Olivais e Moscavide players
Portuguese football managers
Association football midfielders